John Alfred Meaden served as diocesan from 1956 - 1965 of the Diocese of Newfoundland. He was the seventh Bishop of the Diocese.

Meaden received an honorary Doctor of Laws from the Memorial University of Newfoundland in May 1960.

Writings
He published two small books:
The Anglican Church in Newfoundland 
More Historical Notes: Queen's College, Newfoundland

References

External links
Bishop John Meaden
Bishops of Newfoundland
Philip Selwyn Abraham

Anglican bishops of Newfoundland
20th-century Anglican Church of Canada bishops